Elaphrus purpurans is a species of ground beetle in the subfamily Elaphrinae. It was described by Hausen in 1891.

References

Elaphrinae
Beetles described in 1891